Maria Filipa de Oliveira (died July 4, 1873) was an Afro-Brazilian independence fighter from island of Itaparica, Bahia, active during the Brazilian War of Independence. The independence struggled against the Portuguese lasted a little over a year, with many battles centered on the Island of Itaparica. Maria Filipa is noted as one of three women who participated in the struggle for Bahia's independence in 1823, the others being the military figure Maria Quitéria (1792-1853) and Sister Joana Angélica (1761-1822).

Independence struggle

The life of Maria Filipa is poorly documented. She was born on Itaparica Island, date unknown, and was a seafood vendor and laborer. She was a freewoman and likely the daughter of an enslaved family of Sudanese descent; by oral tradition, she was a practitioner of capoeira. She led a group of 200 people, primarily women of Afro-Brazilian and of indigenous populations of Tupinambás and Tapuias, in the Battle of Itaparica, January 7–9, 1823. The provisional government of Bahia recommended that residents of the island evacuate, but Maria Filipa and the resistance group remained, likely because of long-standing conflict, known as the mata-marotos, between the Portuguese and ethnic minorities in Bahia.

The resistance group fortified the island by constructed trenches along its broad beaches, sending supplies to the inland Recôncavo region, and watching the coast by both day and night to prevent the landing of Portuguese troops. Ubaldo Osório Pimentel records that the Maria Filipa's resistance group set fire to some of the 42 Portuguese vessels anchored in the vicinity of the island to invade the city of Salvador. The group is known to have set fire to the Canhoneira Dez de Fevereiro on October 1, 1822 on the Beach of Manguinhos and the Constituição on October 12, 1822 at Praia do Convento. Maria Filipa and other of the independence fought against Portuguese on land in the same period. They used the peixeira, a knife used in the fishmongering trade; and branches of cansanção, any of a number of indigenous species of plants highly poisonous to the skin.

Two watchmen of the vessels, Araújo Mendes and Guimarães das Uvas, were seduced by members of Maria Filipa's group; once nude and drunk, the Portuguese were beaten to death. The "seduction tactic" was similarly carried out in Saubara in the nearby inland city of Santo Amaro. Women in both areas also appeared as souls of the dead using masks and sheets, a tactic which caused the Portuguese to flee and for women fighters to provide relief supplies to Brazilian troops hiding in remote inland areas.

Aftermath

The activities of the group extended to the day when the flag of Brazil was first raised over the Forte de São Lourenço. Maria Filipa, Joana Soaleira, Brígida do Vale, and a woman known as Marcolina occupied the warehouse of the wealthy Portuguese fish merchant Araújo Mendes.

Resting place 

The remains of Maria Filipa are likely located in the Church of Saint Lawrence. Her place of death and burial are poorly documented, but is known to be at the Povoação de Ponta das Baleias, now the historic center of Itaparica.(

Historical documentation

Historian Ubaldo Osório Pimentel, maternal grandfather of the writer João Ubaldo Ribeiro, verified through public documents on records that a group of people, mostly women, led by Maria Filipa defended the coast of Itaparica Island against Portuguese repression. In his book A Ilha de Itaparica, published in 1942, historian Ubaldo Osório Pimentel cites the historical figure of Maria Filipa, which is also mentioned in the historical novel O Sargento Pedro [Sergeant Peter], by Xavier Marques.

See also
Joana Angélica
Maria Quitéria
Dandara
War of Independence of Brazil

References

 REVISTA DE HISTÓRIA DA BIBLIOTECA NACIONAL. Edição nº 117 - Junho de 2015 - Mulheres em Conflito - Matéria A Independência delas. 
 AMADO, Janaína. O Grande mentiroso: tradição, veracidade e informação em história oral. História. São Paulo, n. 14, p. 125-136, 1995.
 FARIAS, Eny Kleyde Vasconcelos de. Maria Felipa de Oliveira: heroína da independência da Bahia. Salvador: Quarteto, 2010.
 MARQUES, Xavier. Sargento Pedro: tradições da independência. 2. ed. Salvador: Catilina, 1921.
 REIS, João José; SILVA, Eduardo. Negociação e Conflito: a resistência negra no Brasil escravista. São Paulo: Companhia das Letras, 1989.
 RIBEIRO, João Ubaldo. Viva o Povo Brasileiro. Rio de Janeiro: Nova Fronteira, 1984.
 TAVARES, Luis Henrique Dias. História da Bahia. 10. ed. Salvador; São Paulo: UNESP; Edufba, 2001.
 __. Independência do Brasil na Bahia. Salvador: EDUFBA, 2005.

External links 
 Maria Felipa, a Heroína Negra da Independência - Projeto Heróis do Brasil.
 3 mulheres são heroínas do 2 de Julho - Tribuna da Bahia - Matéria publicada em 01/07/2013.
 Radionovela "Maria Felipa: a Heroína Esquecida" - Produção IRDEB-BA.
 Coisas da Bahia: conheça a história de Maria Felipa - Programa Aprovado, exibido em 04/04/2015.
 Professores falam sobre a importância de Maria Felipa para a história da Bahia e do Brasil - Bahia Meio Dia Program, showed in 02/07/2012.

Year of birth missing
1873 deaths
19th-century Brazilian people